A Hobo's Christmas is a 1987 American made-for-television drama film directed by Will Mackenzie and produced by Joe Byrne and Paul Freeman for CBS. The screenplay was written by Joe Byrne and Jeb Rosebrook. The film stars Barnard Hughes, Gerald McRaney, Wendy Crewson, William Hickey, Harley Cross, Helen Stenborg, Lee Weaver, and Jamie Sorrentini.

Plot
After abandoning his family in Salt Lake City 25 years prior, Chance (a hobo) decides it's time to go home.

Drifting from place to place, Chance finds himself in his hometown at Christmas time. However, his son (still resenting the fact that Chance ran out on his family 25 years earlier), gives Chance only one day with his grandkids; after that, he's expected to leave and never come back.  Meanwhile, Chance's friends warn him that his son and the past are memories that are best left alone, and should leave, but he has to find out for himself.

Cast
 Barnard Hughes as Chance
 Gerald McRaney as Charlie
 Wendy Crewson as Laurie
 William Hickey as Cincinnati Harold
 Harley Cross as Bobby Grovner
 Helen Stenborg as Mrs. Gladys Morgan
 Michael Flynn as Priest
 Lee Weaver as Biloxi Slim
 Jamie Sorrentini as Kathy Grovner
 Michael Rudd as Omaha John Boswell
 Logan Field as Lt. Nielsen
 Alan Gregory as Desk Clerk
 Laura Hughes as Carolina Blue
 Dana Cutrer as Cajun
 Donré Sampson as Desk Sergeant

Production
Parts of the film were shot in Salt Lake City, Utah.

See also 
 List of Christmas films

References

External links

1987 films
1987 television films
1980s Christmas drama films
American Christmas drama films
CBS network films
Fictional hoboes
Films scored by Mark Snow
Films about families
Films set in Utah
Christmas television films
1987 drama films
American drama television films
1980s English-language films
1980s American films